Holy Spirit School may refer to:

U.S.
 Holy Spirit Catholic Regional School in Tuscaloosa, Alabama
 Holy Spirit Catholic School (San Jose, California)
 Holy Spirit Elementary School (Kentucky) in Louisville, Kentucky
 Holy Spirit High School (New Jersey) in Absecon, New Jersey
 Holy Spirit Preparatory School in Atlanta, Georgia

Elsewhere
 Holy Spirit High School (Newfoundland) in Conception Bay South, Newfoundland and Labrador, Canada
 Holy Spirit School of Tagbilaran in Tagbilaran City, Bohol, Philippines

See also
 Holy Spirit (disambiguation)